The Fort of Beauregard is a fortification located in the French city of Besançon. It is now a historic monument and is open to the public during Heritage Days.

History 
After two wars (in 1674 when Louis XIV of France took the city from the Spanish, and in 1814 when Austria declared war on Napoleon I), the French military decided to build a fort on Bregille hill, to defend the old city of Besançon. This hill is higher than the principal fortification of the city, the citadel of Besançon. Because the hill's strategic position had been used against the city in the past, the necessity for a real military defense there had become evident, and so the fort was built. The first fort on the site was built in 1791; it was captured in 1814 during the Six Days' Campaign. To improve the city's defences, Jacob François Marulaz had another fort built on the site. It may have taken its name from a farm by that name dating back at least to he 217th century.

After the French defeat in the Franco-Prussian War, the French government undertook the building of a defensive line of forts at Dijon, Langres, Besançon, Reims, Laon, and La Fère. Fort de Beuregard was built between 1877 and 1881, and was the first polygonal fort in France. 

The fort was used little, if at all, during the First World War. During the Second World War, the German Occupation forces sited anti-aircraft batteries there to support the Dijon Air Base near Longvic. After the war the fort served as a depot for airbase "102" at Longvic until 1984. The military then essentially abandoned the fort, which became overgrown with vegetation. The military put the fort up for sale in 1997. The SIVOM of Saulon-la-Chapelle purchased it in 1798; the commune of Fénay purchased it on 28 July 2003. Since then the fort has benefited from clearing, cleaning, and clearing projects that have revealed its military heritage. A decree of 17 March 2006 declared the fort an historic monument.

See also 
 Bregille
 Besançon

Forts in France
Buildings and structures in Besançon
Ruins in Bourgogne-Franche-Comté
Tourist attractions in Besançon